The fibrous envelope of the corpus cavernosum urethrae is thinner, whiter in color, and more elastic than that of the corpora cavernosa penis. It is called the trabeculae of corpus spongiosum of penis.

The trabeculae are more delicate, nearly uniform in size, and the meshes between them smaller than in the corpora cavernosa penis: their long diameters, for the most part, corresponding with that of the penis.

The external envelope or outer coat of the corpus cavernosum urethrae is formed partly of unstriped muscular fibers, and a layer of the same tissue immediately surrounds the canal of the urethra.

See also
 Trabeculae of corpora cavernosa of penis

References

Mammal male reproductive system
Human penis anatomy